Léon Johnson (29 February 1876 – 2 January 1943) was a French sport shooter who competed at the 1908 Summer Olympics, the 1912 Summer Olympics and at the 1920 Summer Olympics.

1908 London

In 1908 he was a member of the French team which won the bronze medal in the team free rifle competition.

In the 1908 Summer Olympics he also participated in the following events:

 300 metre free rifle - eighth place
 moving target small-bore rifle - tenth place
 disappearing target small-bore rifle - 21st place

1912 Stockholm

Four years later he participated in the following events:

 Team 50 metre small-bore rifle - fourth place
 Team free rifle - fourth place
 Team military rifle - fifth place
 50 metre pistol - tenth place
 25 metre small-bore rifle - 19th place
 300 metre free rifle, three positions - 24th place

1920 Antwerp

In 1920 he won silver medals in the 300 metre military rifle, prone event and as member of the French team in the team 300 metre military rifle, prone competition.

In the 1920 Summer Olympics he also participated in the following events:

 Team 300 and 600 metre military rifle, prone - fourth place
 Team 30 metre military pistol - fifth place
 Team 50 metre small-bore rifle - fifth place
 Team 300 metre military rifle, standing - fifth place
 Team 600 metre military rifle, prone - fifth place
 Team 50 metre free pistol - sixth place
 50 metre small-bore rifle - result unknown
 300 metre military rifle, standing - result unknown

References

External links
Léon Johnson's profile at databaseOlympics

1876 births
1943 deaths
French male sport shooters
ISSF rifle shooters
ISSF pistol shooters
Olympic shooters of France
Shooters at the 1908 Summer Olympics
Shooters at the 1912 Summer Olympics
Shooters at the 1920 Summer Olympics
Olympic silver medalists for France
Olympic bronze medalists for France
Olympic medalists in shooting
Sportspeople from Nice
Medalists at the 1908 Summer Olympics
Medalists at the 1920 Summer Olympics